David Walsh (born August 1, 1949 in New York City, New York) is an American film critic and the Arts Editor for the World Socialist Web Site.

Works 
 French Workers in Revolt: A New Stage in the Class Struggle, November–December 1995. 
 The Aesthetic Component of Socialism. 
 Hollywood Honors Elia Kazan: Filmmaker and Informer. 
 The Detroit Symphony Strike and the Defense of Culture in the US. 
 The Sky Between the Leaves: Film reviews, essays & interviews 1992-2012.

References

External links
A collection of Walsh's film reviews
"The future of art in an age of crisis" a lecture delivered by Walsh
"The Art And Politics Of Film" an exchange of letters between Walsh and John Steppling
Interview with Walsh on n+1 magazine.
David Walsh's profile on Indiewire.

American film critics
American political writers
American male non-fiction writers
Living people
1949 births
American socialists
Journalists from New York City